St Anne's High School and Junior College is a school in Orlem, Malad, Mumbai, India, under the Roman Catholic Archdiocese of Bombay.

St. Anne’s High School is established and administrated by the Church of Our Lady of Lourdes which is a Roman Catholic Church. The School is under the religious jurisdiction of the Roman Catholic Archbishop of Mumbai and aims primarily at the education of the Catholic community around and to the extent possible, of the members of all other communities. The School stands for academic excellence, development of skills and the service of man as modeled on Jesus Christ, with a view to training citizens distinguished for their all around development and sincere commitment to God and country.

References

Catholic secondary schools in India
Christian schools in Maharashtra
High schools and secondary schools in Mumbai
Educational institutions established in 1915
1915 establishments in India